{{speciesbox
| status = LC | status_system = IUCN3.1
| status_ref = 
| taxon = Salmostoma balookee
| display_parents = 3
| authority = (Sykes, 1839)
| synonyms = 
Chela balookee Sykes, 1839
Chela teekanee Sykes, 1839
Cyprinus clupeoides Bloch, 1795
Chela clupeoides (Bloch, 1795)
Leusiscus clupeoides (Bloch, 1795)
Oxygaster clupeoides (Bloch, 1795)Salmostoma clupeoides (Bloch, 1795)Leuciscus teekanee (Sykes, 1839)Perilampus teekanee (Sykes, 1839)Leuciscus dussumieri Valenciennes, 1844Pelecus affinis Jerdon, 1849Salmostoma kardahiensis Reddiah, 1980
}}Salmostoma balookee, the Bloch razorbelly minnow or Reddiah razorbelly minnow, is a species of cyprinid fish in the genus Salmostoma''. It is distributed in  India and Myanmar.

References 

 

balookee
Fish described in 1839
Taxobox binomials not recognized by IUCN